Tira (Ṭīra, lit. Part of The Triangle, a concentration of Arab towns and villages adjacent to the Green Line, Tira is close to Kfar Saba. It is well known for its weekly farmers' market and for its Arab cuisine. 

Located within Israel's fertile bread basket, by 1976 Tira was estimated to have had up to two-thirds of its land expropriated by the state. Today youth employment prospects are low, which has contributed to the city's high crime rate. Land loss and a lack of access to education for Palestinians may also have contributed.

History

Medieval period
The town of Theraspis recorded on the 6th-century Madaba Map was located somewhere nearby. In the 12th century, during the Crusader period, the village of Tira was owned by the Order of St. John and was leased to Robert of Sinjil and his heirs. In the 14th and 15th century, the village was a stop on the road between Gaza and Damascus, and a khan (inn) was constructed.

Ottoman era
Pierre Jacotin called the village "Ertahah" on his map from 1799.

As the conditions of security on the plains improved in the late Ottoman period, the peasants on the safer hilltop villages who had used the land seasonally began to settle more permanently around the khirbas. Until then, they would pass the winter in the hills and shift down in spring to plough, sow, and reap crops. In Tira's case, the modern population descended from clans hailing from the village of Bāqat al-Ḥaṭab. The Maṣārwa, Arab immigrants from Egypt in Ottoman times, formed a sub-class which in that period lacked a traditional hamula (clan) structure. Because they did not own land, they hired themselves out as agricultural labourers.

By 1870, Victor Guérin found it to be a "village of seven hundred inhabitants, with gardens planted with fig trees and pomegranates, separated from each other by hedges of cactus."

In 1882, the Palestine Exploration Fund's Survey of Western Palestine described "et-Tîreh" as "a conspicuous village on a knoll in the plain, surrounded by olives, with a well on the west side." It was located just south of the monastery Deir 'Asfin on the survey's Plate XI.

British Mandate era
Tira's lands were considered under the Mandate to be among the most fertile in all of Palestine.

In the 1922 census of Palestine conducted by the British Mandate authorities, "Tireh" had a population of 1,588 inhabitants; 1,582 Muslims and 6 Orthodox Christians, increasing in the 1931 census to 2,192; 2,190 Muslims and 2 Christians, in a total of 380 houses.

Of the three village councils established in the area by the Mandatory Authorities in the 1940s, one was in Tira (the other two in Baqa al-Gharbiyye and Tayibe).

Prior to 1948, one kibbutz and two moshavs near TiraRamat HaKovesh, Kfar Hess and Herutwere established after Tira owners sold their properties to Jewish communities. In the 1945 statistics, Tira had 3,180 Muslim inhabitants, who owned a total of 26,803 dunams of land.

State of Israel
During the 1948 Arab-Israeli war, the Israeli Alexandroni Brigade was ordered to "capture and destroy" Tira. However, the village was held by Iraqi troops and not captured. In May 1949, the village was transferred to Israeli control as part of the Jordan-Israeli Armistice Agreement and the villagers were not expelled.

The war had cut off Tira's inhabitants from their fields. After the Armistice, Israel placed the area in the Triangle it had won control of under the administration of its Custodian of Enemy Property, which entailed treating the farmlands of towns like Tira according to its Absentees Property Law. Since the owners had, however, never left the area or abandoned their property, they were defined as present absentees.

A clause in the cease-fire agreement with Jordan stipulated that Israel lay under an obligation to respect the property rights of the citizens in the Triangle. Several attempts over the years to reverse the designation of the property owners, who had become Israeli citizens overnight, as "present absentees" in order to reclaim their land were rebuffed, the Supreme Court of Israel stating that international agreements signed by the Israeli government were not justiciable in Israel's courts.

Early postwar developments
In 1945, Tira's village lands had extended over 31,359 dunams, of which 26,803 were Arab, and 3,720 under Jewish ownership. Over the years 1953-1954, Israel expropriated a block of 5,232 dunams and, by 1962, of the original total, 8,599 dunams remained for village use. The family-clan structure of its residents has not changed since then. Tira, like all other Arab towns in Israel, was placed under military rule, a system not formally abolished until 1966, and in which considerations of jurisdiction were always decided without local consultation, by talks between the military governor and the Ministry of the Interior. This changed in the 1980s, when each town was allowed to have an Arab representative in such councils.

Though Israel abolished the village councils in Tira, and elsewhere, established by the British, in 1952 Tira was given local council status In the township, municipal elections are regarded as far more important than national elections, since the allocation of municipal jobs, the winners'  spoils, depends on who wins control of the council. Politically in these early decades, Tira voted predominantly for Israeli left wing parties.According to Sabri Jiryis, in 1956 the then governor had two members of the Tira local council banished in order to stop them from voting in the elections for a new chairman. He favoured the candidate proposed by General Zionists, the party the governor belonged to, and, once the 2 Arabs were banished, the governor's candidate managed to secure a majority. During the 1965 Knesset elections, Moshe Dayan addressed 3,000 people in the village and stated that the official Israeli policy regarding the integration of its Arab citizens was going too far: integration was "unnecessary" and would not take place.

On the eve of the 1956 Suez Crisis, Tira was one of the border villages subject to a snap curfew. The Border Police officer in charge of Tira, Arye Menashes, asked his commander what to do with the returning villagers who were unaware of the curfew and understood the curt response as meaning that he should kill them. Menashes asked if that applied to women and children, and was told that it did. In the event, unlike at the nearby village of Kfar Qasim where the Border Police murdered 48 people, Menashes decided to disobey the order and allowed the villagers to return to their homes safely.

Al-Ard sports club
An attempt in 1957 to set up a sports club in Tira was suppressed by the Shin Bet, who considered such associations subversive. In 1958 the Al-Ard movement was established by Israeli Arabs to press for equality between Israeli Arabs and Jews. The movement dissented from the view held by Arab Knesset representatives who supported continuing military rule over Israel's Arab communities. The movement was banned in a decision by the Israeli Supreme Court, with judge Moshe Landau declaring that it posed a threat to Israeli security. After its dissolution, Israel cracked down on Arab sports clubs, on the supposition that such associations were supported by al-Ard, closing one in Taibeh. The Tira sports club re-opened however in 1961, and came to be regarded as a leader in the region's Amal movement. When it programmed a festive sports day in April 1964, the government response was to place 5 key club members based in Tira and nearby Kafr Qara members under administrative detention, and subject the two villages to a military closure. Those who did attend the events were arrested. Tira's Tariq 'Abd al-Hayy, had himself supported their closure. Tira resisted pressure by government officials to close down its own club's activities until late 1968, when the authorities ordered its closure when the Ministry of Defence declared it illegal on the grounds that one of the members was associated with Fatah. Later, when the Land Day movement arose, al-Hayy, by then mayor of Tira and a member of the Israeli Labor Party, clamped down on this expression of Palestinian nationalism by repressing the inaugural Land Day strike in Tira. Over 100 policemen were deployed to break the strike, with several villagers shot and some 40 wounded.

Land restrictions
The narrowing of developmental space has meant that land purchases for ownership in the Triangle are four to five times higher per dunam than is the price for 49 year land rents in areas where Jewish villages have been established. The land available for Triangle Arabs has been dwindling through expropriation, pari passu with the growth of their populations. Further slimming took place in the 1980s, when the land under the council's jurisdiction was 12,664 dunams, as portions were reassigned to the Drom HaSharon Regional Council. By 1993, land owned by Tira residents amounted to 11,750 dunams, meaning 0.78 dunams (780 square metres) per person. The Israel Land Authority exercises jurisdiction over 1,000 dunams within this area.

Over the following years, 1994-1995, further confiscations took place, when a network of high-tension power lines to service Jewish settlements was built along the predominantly private owned Trans-Israel toll highway, which itself was calculated to cause the confiscation of over 4,000 dunams of private Arab land in the Triangle, and the infrastructure, with its 300 metres leeway moved off the highway and ran through Tira agricultural tracts, leading to further restrictions of land use. Tira had a further 950 dunams confiscated, and 400 subjected to limitations on use. Residents of Tira and other affected villages protested, arguing that the power lines could have overlapped with the non-construction zone running along the highway, an objection that had led to the rerouting of the lines in the case of the Jewish kibbutz of Eyal. Their petition was rejected by the Supreme Court of Israel. Repeated attempts to reclaim lost land and allow expansion to cope with demographic growth (1983, 1984, 1985, 1986, 1988) were rejected by the Ministry of the Interior. A request to have 400 dunams of land reincorporated under Tira jurisdiction, land owned by Tira residents who pay taxes to the Lev HaSharon Regional Council, was still pending in 1997.

It was granted city status in 1991.

Trump Peace Plan
The Trump peace plan negotiated between Israel and the United States but without Palestinian interlocutors, introduced the possibility of stripping the 350,000 Israeli Arabs in the Triangle, and therefore the citizens of Tira, of their Israeli citizenship rights by transferring that area to an eventual State of Palestine. The prospect is unnerving to the communities that might be affected.

Demographics

According to CBS, in 2004 the ethnic makeup of the city was 99.9% Sunni Muslim Arab citizens of Israel. A small number of Jews also live in Tira, drawn by the cheaper housing costs compared with other nearby Jewish localities, such as Kfar Saba. In the 1990s it witnessed an average annual population increase of 2.8%.

From a population of 3,180 inhabitants in 1945, by 2019 Tira's population had grown to 26 872.

Income
As of 2000, there were 3,654 salaried workers and 953 self-employed individuals in the city, according to the CBS. The mean monthly wage in 2000 for a salaried worker in the city is ILS 3,767, a real change of 2.4% over the course of 2000. Salaried males have a mean monthly wage of ILS 4,494 (a real change of 6.1%) versus ILS 2,319 for females (a real change of −13.0%). The mean income for the self-employed is 4,289. There are 69 people who receive unemployment benefits and 1,183 people who receive an income guarantee. In 2004, 41.9% of the population was part of the workforce.

Education
According to CBS, there are 10 schools and 4,735 students in the city. There are seven elementary schools with 2,896 students, and three high schools with 1,839 students. Of 12th grade students, 64.8% were entitled to a matriculation certificate in 2001.

In 2004, 6.5% of the population had 0 years of education, 17.1% had up to 8 years, 55% had 9 to 12 years, 11.8% had 13–15 years, and 9.7% had 16 or more years of education. Ten percent had an academic degree.

The city's schools include:

Al-Zahraa
Al-Najah
Al-G'azali
Al-Majd
Al-Aomareya
Junior High A
Junior High B
Junior High c(g)
Amal 1- Ibrahim Qsaem High School
Technological High School
Tira's Science High School

High school students from Tira have received scholarships from Israeli universities and participate in exchange programs such as Y.E.S (Bureau of Educational and Cultural Affairs), Seeds of Peace, and CISV.

Violence 
Between 2011 and 2019, 31 homicides were recorded in Tira, equivalent to a rate of 12 per 10,000 people – the fifth highest rate within Israel during the period – according to one study. In 2012, Tira's leaders complained that the police treated Arabs as second class citizens and did not properly investigate crime. A permanent police station was only established in Tira in May 2013. A 2021 crime review suggests that little has changed since, showing that only 1 of 8 murders in Tira since 2020 had been solved, compared to 71% of murders in Jewish communities.

At the time of the establishment of the police station in 2013, it was noted that a contributing problem to the policing of communities such as Tira was the inadequate co-operation with the local population. In 2021, Tira's mayor claimed that the lack of a witness protection program for Arab communities contributed to the fear of providing evidence. A police spokesperson also correlated the rise in crime to the low employment prospects for Arab Israeli youth. According to Nimer Sultany, a Palestinian citizen of Israel and a law professor from Tira, the high crime and poverty rate can be traced back to decades of land confiscation, home demolition, incarceration and discrimination in education and employment in the traditionally agricultural town.

Sister cities
Tira is twinned with:
  Burg bei Magdeburg, Germany.

Notable people

 Dalia Fadila, educator and entrepreneur
 Sayed Kashua, author and journalist
 Nimer Sultany, law scholar and constitutionalist

See also
 Arab localities in Israel

References

Notes

Citations

Sources

External links
 Official website 
 Welcome To Tira
 Palestinian Localities in the Triangle Area
 Survey of Western Palestine, Map 11: IAA, Wikimedia commons
  

Arab localities in Israel
Cities in Central District (Israel)
Cities in Israel
Sharon plain
Triangle (Israel)